The isabelline white-winged serotine (Neoromicia isabella) is a species of West African bat belonging to the genus Neoromicia. It is found in Guinea.

Taxonomy
The isabelline white-winged serotine was described as a new species in 2015 by Decher, Huttere and Monadjem. Its species name "isabella" refers to the color isabelline, which is a creamy brown. It refers to the coloration of the bat's dorsal fur, in addition to being the given name of Decher's daughter Isabelle.

Description 
The flight membranes, tail membrane and the fur of the belly are white, along with the ears, lips and feet which are slightly off white. The hairs on the back are light orange-brown. This coloration differentiates it from other species of West African bats.

Distribution and habitat 
This species occurs in upper Guinea. So far, its known distribution is limited to the Guinee Forestiere Region of Guinea and the Liberian side of the Mount Nimba range. It is thought to inhabit subtropical and tropical forests and lowlands.

Conservation and threats 
The species is listed as data deficient in the IUCN Red List due to lack of knowledge about its population. However, it is thought to be threatened by habitat loss caused by agriculture and iron ore mining, both of which occur in its known geographical range.

References 

Neoromicia
Mammals described in 2015
Bats of Africa